Bryan Cesar Ramadhan (born 16 March 1993) is an Indonesian professional footballer who plays as a midfielder for Liga 1 club PSM Makassar.

Career statistics

Club

References

External links
 Bryan Cesar at Soccerway
 Bryan Cesar at Liga Indonesia

1993 births
Living people
People from Balikpapan
Persiba Balikpapan players
PSM Makassar players
Liga 1 (Indonesia) players
Sportspeople from East Kalimantan
Indonesian footballers
Association football midfielders